Byrd Township may refer to the following townships in the United States:

 Byrd Township, Cape Girardeau County, Missouri
 Byrd Township, Brown County, Ohio